Presidential elections were held in the Republic of the Congo for the first time on 26 March 1961. The only candidate was the incumbent, Fulbert Youlou of the Democratic Union for the Defense of African Interests, who was re-elected unopposed. Voter turnout was 90.3%.

Results

References

Presidential elections in the Republic of the Congo
Congo
1961 in the Republic of the Congo
Single-candidate elections